The Belgariad is a five-book fantasy epic written by David Eddings, following the journey of protagonist Garion and his companions, first to recover a sacred stone, and later to use it against antagonist Torak. It was a bestseller from the first book in the series. It has been called both the "last gasp" of traditional fantasy and "one of the founding megasagas" of modern fantasy.

Background 
David Eddings, who had been writing adventure and thriller genres, has said he developed the idea for a fantasy series somewhat "cynically" after noticing how many times J. R. R. Tolkien's The Lord of the Rings series had been reprinted. He had an epiphany, realizing the fantasy genre might be very lucrative and was currently "underserved". He mapped out an imaginary world to use in developing the story for the Belgariad.

He has also said he was influenced by reading medieval epics and by Lester del Rey's editorial input. In later works he acknowledged his wife, Leigh Eddings, as an "unindicted collaborator"; eventually later books credited her as co-author. She is generally acknowledged as a co-author of the earlier books as well.

Characters

Works in the series 

The title of each book combines a chess term with a fantasy term; whereas the concept of a 'Game of Destiny' is a significant motif in the story. The series has been reprinted as a two-volume set, titled The Belgariad Volume One, containing the first three books of the series, and The Belgariad Volume Two, which contains the last two books. This does not include the original map by Chris Barbieri, but only Shelly Shapiro's map.

The Malloreon is a five-book sequel to The Belgariad. Belgarath the Sorcerer (1995) and Polgara the Sorceress (1997) are prequels that share the setting and most characters. The Rivan Codex (1998) features annotated background material.

Pawn of Prophecy 

The book opens with a prologue, beginning with the creation of the world by seven gods. Aldur, oldest of the seven, fashions a stone orb and creates within it a "living soul". Torak, the most beautiful of the seven, attempts to seize the Orb from Aldur and subdue the Orb's intelligence; the Orb mutilates the left side of Torak's body. The Orb of Aldur is later recovered by Belgarath the Sorcerer, King Cherek, and Cherek's sons. Riva, Cherek's youngest son, is found to be able to hold the Orb unharmed; he and his descendants protect the Orb from Torak.

The story then begins in earnest with the experiences of protagonist Garion. His childhood on a large, prosperous farm: his earliest memories in the kitchen of his Aunt Pol; his friend Durnik the blacksmith; early games and friends; and the romance between Garion and local girl Zubrette. It also introduces Belgarath, as a wandering storyteller nicknamed 'Mister Wolf'; Garion's telepathic vision of the antagonist Asharak/Chamdar; and a "dry voice" in his mind, distinct from his own consciousness. The reader later discovers that this is the Voice of Prophecy, or "Necessity", which takes action through him.

When Belgarath, alias "Wolf", announces the theft of a mysterious object (actually the Orb), he, Garion, and Aunt Pol leave Faldor's farm to pursue the thief, reluctantly allowing Durnik to accompany them. They are joined later by Silk/Kheldar, a Drasnian prince, spy, and thief; and by Barak, a Cherek earl. Thereafter Mister Wolf follows an invisible trail through several regions until they are arrested.

They are taken to a meeting of monarchs where Garion suspects a green-cloaked individual of treason. A few days later, Barak and Garion are hunting wild boar when Garion notices the green-cloaked spy discussing further espionage; but before Garion can tell anyone of this, he is attacked by a wild boar, which is then slain by Barak in the form of a bear. Garion later exposes the green-cloaked spy, and the latter's patrons are defeated in a fight. Garion himself is almost captured, but escapes. 
Garion learns that Polgara is Belgarath's daughter and the sister of Garion's second-most-distant female ancestor (identified in the prologue as Queen Beldaran, wife of Riva), and for that reason called his aunt. Having learned this, Garion identifies Belgarath as his grandfather. The group, with the addition of an Algarian prince named Hettar, then leave in search of the Orb.

Queen of Sorcery 

The story opens in the Kingdom of Arendia, where Garion duels and then befriends a master archer named Lelldorin. The party travel to Lelldorin's uncle's manor, where Garion hears about a plot to kill the Mimbrate king Korodullin and to start a civil war between the two grand duchies. The plot is masterminded by a spy from Cthol Murgos named Nachak. Garion's friends are joined thereafter by Korodullin's knight, Mandorallen.

The party continue to Vo Mimbre, the Arendish capital, where Garion reveals the plot to kill Korodullin, without naming its local conspirators, and Mandorallen challenges Nachak to a duel, which Hettar terminates by killing Nachak. The party travels to Tolnedra, to talk to the Emperor Ran Borune in the city of Tol Honeth, and are nearly captured by a group of mercenaries for the Queen of neighboring Nyissa. At Tol Honeth, Belgarath and Polgara urge the Emperor to rid Tolnedra of the invading 'Murgos'; but Ran Borune refuses. Upon leaving the capital, the group acquire an ineffectually-disguised Princess Ce'Nedra (Ran Borune's daughter), and enter the Wood of the Dryads, hoping to cross into Nyissa ahead of their opponent Zedar. In the Wood, Ce'Nedra asks the Dryad Queen Xantha for sanctuary, on grounds of common ancestry; but is refused. Splitting up on the way to the Nyissan capital of Sthiss Tor, they are detained by Tolnedran legionnaires under Grand Duke Kador of Tol Vordue, accompanied by Asharak, who demand Ce'Nedra to ensure Kador's chances of the throne. When Asharak slaps Polgara, Garion strikes him such that he bursts into flames and dies; whereupon Grand Duke Kador is taken prisoner by his soldiers.

Arriving at Nyissa by boat, Garion, angry at the treatment of the slaves there, uses the Will and the Word (the ability shared by himself with Belgarath, Polgara, and all other sorcerers in the story) to teleport one but does not know that the leeches in the river are poisonous so the slave dies. Following a quarrel with Polgara, during which she explains to him that the power he had used to kill Asharak was the same as the one he had earlier used unwittingly to cure a madman, Garion is kidnapped, drugged, and given as a gift to Queen Salmissra. He is rescued by Polgara and Barak (the latter again assuming a bear's shape); and Polgara, with permission by Issa, the god of the Nyissans, transforms Salmissra into an immortal snake. Thereafter Garion is reconciled with Polgara.

Magician's Gambit 

In the third book of the series, after learning that the Angarak sorcerer Ctuchik has stolen the Orb from its erstwhile thief Zedar, Belgarion and friends go after him, via the Vale of Aldur. In a sacred cave, Garion brings a dead colt back to life. This is of significance because Polgara and Belgarath maintained that before this, it was impossible to use the Will and the Word to restore life to the dead. To save time, the group passes through the haunted land of Maragor, whose inhabitants were killed or enslaved when the Tolnedrans invaded them to obtain gold and whose god Mara drove every invader insane. To protect their minds, Belgarath and Polgara place their companions in a trance, during which the voice of prophecy teaches Garion of its own purpose and his control of the Will and the Word. At the center of the ruins, Mara attempts to drive Ce'Nedra insane; but is prevented by the voice.

In the Vale of Aldur, Garion practices the Will and the Word, and learns from Belgarath. The group enters Ulgoland, and there recruit the local zealot Relg as a guide to Cthol Murgos. Ce'Nedra is left behind as a guest of Gorim, the Ulgos' supreme authority, when UL warns them against taking her to Cthol Murgos. At Cthol Murgos itself, Belgarath fights Ctuchik until Ctuchik attempts to "unmake" the Orb and thus "unmakes" himself. The group escapes, taking the now unconscious Belgarath, a boy later nicknamed Errand, who carries the Orb unharmed, and an escaped slave named Taiba, descendant of the Marags sold into slavery.

Castle of Wizardry 

The role of leader is thrust upon Garion when Belgarath and Polgara are incapacitated: the former by his battle with Ctuchik and the latter by protecting Errand. Garion thereafter incapacitates the Hierarchs of Rak Cthol in retaliation for an attack upon Durnik. With Errand continuously trying to give the Orb of Aldur to one of the company (its donation being the source of his name), they return to Ulgo for Ce'Nedra and eventually reach the Isle of the Winds, the object of their journey.

There, Belgarion is led by Belgarath, Polgara, and the Voice of Prophecy to accept the Orb of Aldur from Errand in the Hall of the Rivan King, where the ancient Sword rests above the Rivan Throne. In Garion's hands, the Orb identifies him as the long-lost heir to the throne. This revelation infuriates Ce'Nedra, who discovers herself betrothed to him. During the investiture, Garion, aided by the Voice of Prophecy, sees each member of the quest as an Instrument of Prophecy.

Shortly after the betrothal, Garion learns from the Mrin Prophecy that the Rivan King must slay the god Torak or die in the process. Belgarion, Belgarath, and Silk therefore set out to challenge Torak, leaving only a note to Polgara and Ce'Nedra with instructions not to pursue them; whereupon Polgara enters a rage, which devastates her apartment and causes a thunderstorm overhead. Having learnt the reason of Belgarion's departure, Ce'Nedra raises an international army to distract the Angaraks from Garion's quest so that he may reach Cthol Mishrak safely and overcome Torak.

Enchanters' End Game 

The final book of the series starts with Belgarion, Silk, and Belgarath sneaking through Gar og Nadrak, whence they cross into Mallorea. Garion is tempted by Torak to accept him as a father and Polgara as his mother, but rejects this offer and reaches Cthol Mishrak unchallenged.

Ce'Nedra's army invades Angarak lands, and wins a hard-fought battle at Thull Mardu with both physical and magical powers employed by both sides. However, in the moment of victory Ce'Nedra, Polgara, Durnik, and Errand are captured by the emperor Zakath of Mallorea, who gives them to Zedar to offer to Torak. En route to Cthol Mishrak, Polgara reveals that the Mallorean Prophecies identify her as Torak's fiancée, and that her resistance to Torak's call may decide Belgarion's duel. Zedar takes his prisoners to Torak's chamber, where Zedar kills Durnik, enraging Belgarath, who buries him alive. Torak attempts to sway Polgara; but Garion sends images of Durnik into her mind, thereby helping her to withstand Torak's call. A final battle ensues, during which Garion and Torak swell into immensity, and in which Garion, having 'rejected' Torak again, kills him outright. The other gods claim Torak's body, and UL, revealed as the father of the gods, agrees to allow Garion to revive Durnik; Mara objects, but relents when Belgarath reveals the existence of Taiba.

Upon the company's return to Riva, Garion and Ce'Nedra plan their wedding, while Polgara and Durnik are married in a private chapel in the Citadel. Here, Durnik reveals that he received the Will and the Word when he was brought back to life, and that Belgarath had been training him to control the "will and the word". Ce'Nedra and Garion are married, dance with everyone, and retire to their chambers. The story ends with a half-drunk Belgarath having a conversation with the Orb, while Garion and Ce'Nedra consummate their marriage.

Reception and impact 
The series was a bestseller and an instant sensation. Publishers Weekly in their review of The Rivan Codex (1998) called The Belgariad "one of the founding megasagas in modern English-language fantasy." The Guardian credited Eddings with creating "the craze for doorstopper-sized fantasy series". The series was published in a transitional period for fantasy literature, when the genre was becoming more "complex and nuanced," and the Eddings books were a sort of "last gasp" of popularity for traditional fantasy. Stephen Hunt said the books "were fantasy, but they carried a modern feel to the dialogue and characterisation, while still being firmly placed in a deeply believable fantasy world." 

Jason Heller wrote a retrospective on the series for NPR in 2017 after re-reading the books as an adult ~30 years after reading them originally.  He found the archetypical fantasy aspects had aged reasonably well despite his expectations that the tropes might feel worn out, and noted the story's very direct use of the hero's journey from Joseph Campbell.  Heller did find that the gender roles had aged poorly, though: 

Heller also felt that the series uncritically mirrored the real-life East–West dichotomy, and that this aspect also bothered him as an adult.  The protagonists are largely fair-skinned good guys in the West, while the antagonists of the series are from the kingdoms of the East and "systematically sinister or congenitally stupid."

References

External links 

 A Timeline for the Belgariad and the Malloreon
 Glossary of Characters
 A MUD set in the world of the Belgariad and the Malloreon

1980s fantasy novels
David Eddings sequences
High fantasy novels
Fantasy novel series
Pentalogies